The Fall of a Nation, a Sequel to The Birth of a Nation, is an invasion literature novel by Thomas Dixon Jr. Dixon described it as "a burning theme, our need of preparation to defend ourselves in the world war." First published by D. Appleton & Company in 1916, Dixon directed a film version released the same year. The film is now considered lost.

Plot 

A European army headed by Germany invades America and executes children and war veterans. However, America is saved by a pro-war Congressman who raises an army to defeat the invaders with the support of a suffragette.

See also
The Birth of a Nation
The Fall of a Nation
''Conquest of the United States
Invasion literature

References

External links
The Fall of a Nation at Google Books
The Fall of a Nation, at Project Gutenberg

1916 American novels
American novels adapted into films
D. Appleton & Company books
Novels by Thomas Dixon Jr.
Invasion literature